The Tell-Tale Heart is a 1960 British horror film directed by Ernest Morris produced by the Danzigers. The screenplay by Brian Clemens and Eldon Howard is a loose adaptation of the 1843 short story of the same name by Edgar Allan Poe. The film was released in England in December 1960, and in the U.S. in February 1962 as The Hidden Room of 1,000 Horrors.

Plot
Edgar Marsh, a shy librarian obsessed with erotica, becomes infatuated with his neighbour Betty Clare when he sees her undressing in her bedroom. He invites her to dinner, and although she clearly is uncomfortable with the attention he pays her, he showers her with jewelry and fantasizes about their future. Complications arise when he introduces her to his friend Carl Loomis, whom Betty finds far more attractive and appealing. After witnessing Carl and Betty together in her bedroom, Edgar bludgeons Carl to death with a poker and buries him beneath the floorboards in his piano room. His overwhelming guilt leads him to believe a ticking metronome and the incessant dripping of a faucet actually are the sound of his victim's heart still beating.

Cast
Laurence Payne ..... Edgar Marsh
Adrienne Corri ..... Betty Clare
Dermot Walsh ..... Carl Loomis

Production
Around the time the film was produced typical budget of the Danzigers' feature film was £15,000. This cost a little more due to its period setting and necessitated shooting in black and white.

Critical reception
The Tell-Tale Heart was selected by the film historians Steve Chibnall and Brian McFarlane as one of the 15 most meritorious British B films made between World War II and 1970. They note that it also received enthusiastic reviews at the time of its release from The Monthly Film Bulletin and Kinematograph Weekly.

References

External links

1960 films
1960 horror films
British black-and-white films
British independent films
British horror films
Films based on The Tell-Tale Heart
Films shot at New Elstree Studios
1960s English-language films
Films directed by Ernest Morris
1960s British films